Airhitch was a user-run system for hitchhiking on commercial airliners. It was started by Robert Segelbaum in 1969. People, who travel in this way, generally refer to themselves as Airhitchers. Most airhitchers fly between the United States and Western Europe. Before Airhitch migrated to internet based communication in the 1990s, it operated out of North American offices including New York, Los Angeles (Santa Monica), San Francisco, Seattle, Montreal, and Vancouver, and numerous European cities including Paris, Amsterdam, Berlin, Bonn, and Rome. Airhitch is a non-commercial system/method/process. Today, virtually, all exchange of Airhitch information takes place in an AIM chat room. In the chat room, Airhitchers use their real names, while the staff use screen names such as Airhitch01, and Airhitch08.

Since 2006, the cost and availability of "Airhitchable" flights has been questionable. Before the website (airhitch.org) and business went defunct in 2009, the majority of "AHers", opt to help each other find conventional airfare to their destinations.

The Airhitching process

Registration: Airhitchers formally commit to participation in the Airhitch system by sending an online registration to the staff. 
Flight-Briefing: With the guidance of the staff,  Airhitchers explore the best possibilities for catching rides on flights and the procedural mechanics of how to take advantage of them.
Decision: Airhitchers decide which flight they will attempt to board. 
Boarding: Airhitchers go to the airport and attempt to board the aircraft.

Controversy

Around the year 2000, there were two websites with very similar names claiming the name Air Hitch, and both denied any affiliation with the other. At the time, the system used prepaid vouchers. Due to the similar websites and general nature of online reviews, it was not clear which website was part of the legitimate airhitch system.

Some online user reviews talked of invalid vouchers and scam tactics. Including invalid mailing address for the returns office and refund policies designed with procedures and time frames just long enough to prevent credit card payment chargebacks; as well as falsely advertising frequent flights from certain large regions where no airline was actually accepting the vouchers, leading to a costly round of ground transit from region to region chasing phantom flights followed by the refund policies previously mentioned.

See also
Hitchhiking
Standby (air travel)

References

External links 
 Airhitch's US Patent application for an "Internet air travel system" 
 The downside of using airhitch at digihitch.com
 Remembering Airhitch founder Robert Segelbaum at boston.com

Hitchhiking
Online chat
American travel websites
Defunct American websites
Defunct non-profit organizations based in the United States
Aviation organizations